Jean Baptiste Okello (born 10 April 1940) is a former athlete, who was born in Lira, Northern Region, Uganda. Competing for Uganda at the 1960 Summer Olympics, he reached the semi-final of the 110 metres Hurdles, and was part of the  4 × 100 metres relay squad.

References

External links
 

1940 births
Living people
Athletes (track and field) at the 1960 Summer Olympics
Ugandan male sprinters
Ugandan male hurdlers
Olympic athletes of Uganda
Place of birth missing (living people)
People from Lira District